Tobias Ericsson (born  in Stockholm) is a Swedish professional ice hockey player (left wing). He played 41 games with AIK of the Elitserien (SEL) in the 2010–11 season. His originally played with his youth team, Vallentuna BK.

After two seasons with Mora IK, including the 2012–13 season as Captain, Ericsson left to sign as a free agent to a contract with rival Allsvenskan club, Malmö on March 11, 2013.

Career statistics

References

External links

Living people
1987 births
AIK IF players
Mora IK players
Swedish ice hockey left wingers
Ice hockey people from Stockholm